The Sinfonia Concertante for Violin, Viola and Orchestra in E major, K. 364 (320d), was written by Wolfgang Amadeus Mozart.

At the time of its composition in 1779, Mozart was on a tour of Europe that included Mannheim and Paris. He had been experimenting with the sinfonia concertante genre and this work can be considered his most successful realization in this cross-over genre between symphony and concerto.

Instrumentation
The piece is scored in three movements for solo violin, solo viola, two oboes, two horns, and strings, the last including a divided viola section, which accounts for the work's rich harmony.

The solo viola part is written in D major instead of E major, and the instrument tuned a semitone sharper (scordatura technique), to give a more brilliant tone. This technique is uncommon when performed on the modern viola and is used mostly in performance on original instruments.

Movements

Recordings
Richard Wigmore in Gramophone (October 2015) writes that there are over 40 CD recordings in all. He rates as best to date one by  Iona Brown, violinist and conductor, and Lars Anders Tomter, viola, with the Norwegian Chamber Orchestra, Chandos CHAN9695. Also on his short list is a 1989 recording, with Iona Brown, and with Nobuko Imai, viola. Mention should also be made of the 1951 Casals Perpignan Festival recording with Isaac Stern and William Primrose, Casals conducting.

Legacy

This Sinfonia Concertante has influenced many arrangers to use its themes. In 1808 an uncredited arrangement of the piece for a string sextet was published by  under the title Grande Sestetto Concertante. All six parts are divided equally among the six players; it is not presented as soloists with accompaniment. It has also been arranged for cello in place of the viola part.

The Sinfonia Concertante was mentioned in William Styron's 1979 novel Sophie's Choice; after a stranger molests Sophie on the subway, she hears the Sinfonia Concertante on the radio, which brings back memories of her childhood in Kraków and snaps her out of her depression. Variations on the slow second movement were used for the soundtrack to the 1988 Peter Greenaway film Drowning by Numbers by composer Michael Nyman. The original piece is also heard after each of the drownings in the screenplay.

Notes

References

Further reading
Mordden, Ethan. A Guide to Orchestral Music: A Handbook for Non-Musicians (Oxford, 1980).
Smith, Erik. Notes to Mozart Sinfonia Concertante K364 (L.P. DECCA 1964)

External links

Concertos by Wolfgang Amadeus Mozart
Mozart
Compositions for viola and orchestra
Mozart
1779 compositions
Compositions in E-flat major